The 19th Irish Film & Television Academy Awards, also called the IFTA Film & Drama Awards 2023 or the 20th Anniversary IFTA Awards, will take place on 7 May 2023, hosted by Deirdre O'Kane. Nominations were announced on 6 March 2023.

Film

Best film
 Aisha
 The Banshees of Inisherin
 God's Creatures
 Lakelands
 Róise & Frank
 The Wonder

Director
 Frank Berry – Aisha
 Antonia Campbell-Hughes – It Is In Us All
 Martin McDonagh – The Banshees of Inisherin
 Conor McMahon – Let the Wrong One In
 Rachael Moriarty & Peter Murphy – Róise & Frank
 Emer Reynolds – Joyride

Script 
 Frank Berry – Aisha
 Shane Crowley – God's Creatures
 Ailbhe Keogan – Joyride
 Martin McDonagh – The Banshees of Inisherin
 Conor McMahon – Let the Wrong One In
 Rachael Moriarty & Peter Murphy – Róise & Frank

Actress in a leading role
 Zara Devlin – Ann
 Danielle Galligan – Lakelands 
 Kelly Gough – Tarrac
 Seána Kerslake – Ballywalter
 Bríd Ní Neachtain – Róise & Frank
 Alisha Weir – Matilda the Musical

Actor in a leading role
 Colin Farrell – The Banshees of Inisherin
 Éanna Hardwicke – Lakelands
 Daryl McCormack – Good Luck to You, Leo Grande
 Paul Mescal – Aftersun
 Liam Neeson – Marlowe
 Ollie West – Sparrow

Actress in a supporting role
 Jessie Buckley – Women Talking
 Elaine Cassidy – The Wonder
 Kíla Lord Cassidy – The Wonder
 Kerry Condon – The Banshees of Inisherin
 Aisling Franciosi – God's Creatures
 Eileen Walsh – Ann

Actor in a supporting role
 Pierce Brosnan – Black Adam
 Colin Farrell – The Batman
 Brendan Gleeson – The Banshees of Inisherin
 Barry Keoghan – The Banshees of Inisherin
 Paul Mescal – God's Creatures
 Andrew Scott – Catherine Called Birdy

George Morrison Feature Documentary
 The Artist & The Wall of Death
 The Ghost of Richard Harris
 How To Tell A Secret
 Million Dollar Pigeons
 North Circular
 Nothing Compares

Short film – Live action
 An Irish Goodbye
 Call Me Mommy
 Don't Go Where I Can’t Find You
 Lamb
 Wednesday's Child
 You're Not Home

Animated short 
 Candlelight
 Dagda's Harp
 Red Rabbit
 Soft Tissue

Television drama

Drama
 Bad Sisters
 Conversations with Friends
 Derry Girls: The Agreement
 The Dry
 Smother
 Vikings: Valhalla

Director
 Lenny Abrahamson – Conversations with Friends
 Paddy Breathnach – The Dry 
 Dathaí Keane – Smother
 Aoife McArdle – Severance
 Laura Way – Maxine
 Dearbhla Walsh – Bad Sisters

Script
 Ronan Bennett – Top Boy
 Nancy Harris – The Dry
 Sharon Horgan – Bad Sisters
 Lisa McGee – Derry Girls: The Agreement
 Mark O'Halloran – Conversations with Friends
 Kate O'Riordan – Smother

Actress in a leading role
 Caitríona Balfe – Outlander 
 Roisin Gallagher – The Dry
 Sharon Horgan  – Bad Sisters 
 Dervla Kirwan – Smother
 Siobhan McSweeney – Holding
 Alison Oliver – Conversations with Friends

Actor in a leading role
 Conleth Hill – Holding
 Kerr Logan – North Sea Connection
 Vinnie McCabe – The Noble Call
 Jason O'Mara – Smother
 Stephen Rea – The English
 Aidan Turner – The Suspect

Actress in a supporting role
 Eva Birthistle – Bad Sisters
 Anne-Marie Duff – Bad Sisters
 Brenda Fricker – Holding
 Eve Hewson – Bad Sisters
 Genevieve O'Reilly – Andor
 Sarah Greene – Bad Sisters

Actor in a supporting role
 Moe Dunford – The Dry
 Brian Gleeson – Bad Sisters
 Ciarán Hinds – The Dry
 Daryl McCormack – Bad Sisters
 Michael Smiley – Bad Sisters
 Tommy Tiernan – Conversations with Friends

Craft

Original Music
 Irene Buckley, Linda Buckley – Nothing Compares
 Daithí – Lakelands
 Sarah Lynch – The Dry 
 Colm Mac Con Iomaire – Róise & Frank
 Stephen Rennicks – Good Luck to You, Leo Grande

Editing
 Colin Campbell – Aisha
 Tony Cranstoun – Nocebo
 Mick Mahon – Nothing Compares
 Úna Ní Dhonghaíle – Death on the Nile
 Jonathan Redmond, Matt Villa – Elvis

Production Design
 Ray Ball – Mr. Malcolm's List
 Tamara Conboy – Aisha
 Tom Conroy – Vikings: Valhalla
 Mark Geraghty – Bad Sisters
 Padraig O’Neill – Róise & Frank

Cinematography
 Eleanor Bowman – How to Tell a Secret
 Suzie Lavelle – Conversations with Friends
 Piers McGrail – It Is In Us All
 Cathal Watters – The Dry
 Peter Robertson – You Are Not My Mother

Costume Design
 Joan Bergin – Disenchanted
 Consolata Boyle – Enola Holmes 2 
 Eimer Ní Mhaoldomhnaigh – The Banshees of Inisherin
 Susan O'Connor Cave – Vikings: Valhalla
 Kathy Strachan – Aisha

Makeup & Hair
 Dumebi Anozie, Liz Byrne – Aisha
 Eileen Buggy, Sharon Doyle – Mr. Malcolm's List
 Orla Carroll, Lynn Johnston, Dan Martin – The Banshees of Inisherin
 Lorri Ann King, Morna Ferguson – The Wonder
 Joe Whelan, Tom McInerney – Vikings: Valhalla

Sound
 Aisha
 The Banshees of Inisherin
 Conversations with Friends
 The Sparrow
 The Wonder

VFX
 The Banshees of Inisherin
 Marlowe
 Stranger Things
 The Woman King

International

Best International Film
 Aftersun
 All Quiet on the Western Front
 Elvis
 Tár
 The Fabelmans
 Top Gun: Maverick

Best International Actor
 Austin Butler – Elvis
 Tom Cruise – Top Gun: Maverick
 Cosmo Jarvis –  It Is In Us All
 Felix Kammerer – All Quiet On The Western Front
 Josh O'Connor – Aisha
 Albrecht Schuch – All Quiet On The Western Front

Best International Actress
 Cate Blanchett – Tár
 Viola Davis – The Woman King
 Florence Pugh – The Wonder
 Emily Watson – God’s Creatures
 Michelle Williams – The Fabelmans
 Letitia Wright – Aisha

See also
2022 in Irish television
2023 in Irish television
76th British Academy Film Awards
2023 British Academy Television Awards

Notes

References

External links
 Awards at the Irish Film and Television Academy official website

2022 in Irish television
19
2022 film awards
2022 television awards
2023 film awards